Confirmation predominantly refers to a rite of passage, mostly (but not exclusively) Christian: 
 Confirmation
 Confirmation (Latter Day Saints)
 Confirmation (Lutheran Church)
 Confirmation (Roman Catholic Church)
 Chrismation, or confirmation (Eastern Christianity)

Confirmation or confirm may also refer to:

Arts and entertainment
 Confirmation (film), a 2016 television film about Anita Hill and Clarence Thomas
 The Confirmation, a 2016 Canadian film
 "Confirmation" (composition), a 1945 jazz standard by Charlie Parker
 Confirmation (Barry Harris and Kenny Barron album), 1992 
 Confirmation (Tommy Flanagan album), 1982
 "Confirmation", a 2020 song by Justin Bieber from the album Changes

Science and philosophy
 Confirmation, a part of the scientific method
 Confirmation holism, the claim that a single scientific theory cannot be tested in isolation
 Bayesian confirmation theory, a quantitative, as opposed to a qualitative, theory of confirmation
 Verificationism, adherence to the verification principle proposed by A. J. Ayer in Language, Truth and Logic

Other uses
 Confirm Project, an intended computer reservation and distribution system
 Probate, known in Scotland as confirmation
 Senate confirmation, a process of confirming a presidential nominee by the United States Senate
 Tenure, at universities in Australia and New Zealand, referred to as confirmation

See also
 Conformation (disambiguation)
 Conformity (disambiguation)